Sclerococcum aptrootii is a species of lichenicolous fungus in the family Dactylosporaceae. Found in Puerto Rico, it was formally described as a new species in 2015 by Belgian mycologist Paul Diederich. It is only known to occur at the type locality. The fungus forms black, rounded sporodochia that measure 50–100 μm in diameter; it does not otherwise damage the host. The species epithet honours Dutch lichenologist André Aptroot, who collected the type in 1989.

References

Lecanorales
Fungi described in 2015
Fungi of the Caribbean
Lichenicolous fungi